Iyad Sughayer (born 16 October 1993 in Amman) is a Jordanian-Palestinian classical pianist.

Sughayer started playing the piano at the age of five and studied at the National Music Conservatory (NMC) in Amman, Jordan. He was taught by the piano composer and conductor of the Amman Symphony Orchestra, Muhammed Othman Sidiq. From 2008 he studied at Chetham's School of Music in Manchester, England, with Murray McLachlan and Marie-Louise Taylor. He graduated from the Royal Northern College of Music as a scholar in Manchester and from the Trinity Laban Conservatoire of Music and Dance in London.

Sughayer has participated in many concerts outside Jordan, including in Cyprus, Italy, and Lithuania. In the United Kingdom, he has played at Manchester Cathedral. He has played with orchestras including the Amman Symphony Orchestra, BBC Philharmonic Orchestra, the Cairo Symphony Orchestra, the European Union Chamber Orchestra, and the Manchester Camerata.

Sughayer is an artist with the City Music Foundation. He was the Trinity Laban 2018 Gold Medalist. He has studied with Martino Tirimo and Peter Tuite. In 2019, his debut album with BIS Records was released, featuring piano works by the Armenian composer Aram Khachaturian (1903–1978).

References

External links
 

1993 births
Living people
People from Amman
Jordanian pianists
Palestinian musicians
Jordanian expatriates in the United Kingdom
Palestinian expatriates in the United Kingdom
People educated at Chetham's School of Music
Alumni of the Royal Northern College of Music
Alumni of Trinity Laban Conservatoire of Music and Dance
21st-century classical pianists
Male classical pianists
21st-century male musicians